Calopieris is a genus of butterflies in the family Pieridae. It consists of only one species, Calopieris eulimene, which is found in Egypt (Gebel Elba Protected Area), Chad, Sudan, the Red Sea coast, western Saudi Arabia and Yemen.

References

Seitz, A. Die Gross-Schmetterlinge der Erde 13: Die Afrikanischen Tagfalter. Plate XIII 16 a

Teracolini
Monotypic butterfly genera
Taxa named by Per Olof Christopher Aurivillius
Pieridae genera